The 1993 Vienna Cup took place on September 1993. Skaters competed in the disciplines of men's singles, ladies' singles, and ice dancing.

Results

Men

Ladies

Sources
 Official Protocol of the competition

Karl Schäfer Memorial
Karl Schafer Memorial, 1993
Karl Schafer Memorial